White Blood Cells is the third studio album by American rock duo the White Stripes, released on July 3, 2001. The album was recorded in less than one week at Easley-McCain Recording in Memphis, Tennessee, and was produced by frontman and guitarist Jack White. It was the band's final record released independently on Sympathy for the Record Industry. The album explores themes of love, hope, betrayal, and paranoia, which were inspired by the increased media attention the group were receiving. 

White Blood Cells was released to critical and commercial success. It produced the groundbreaking single "Fell in Love with a Girl" which was paired with its equally successful stop motion music video, as well as the singles "Dead Leaves and the Dirty Ground", "Hotel Yorba" and "We're Going to Be Friends". The album, along with the band's 2003 follow-up Elephant, has been featured on several music publications' lists of the greatest albums of the 2000s as well as all-time. Uncut ranked the album first on their 2009 list of The Greatest Albums of the 21st Century to that point, and Rolling Stone ranked the album at number 497 on its 2012 list of The 500 Greatest Albums of All Time.

Background
Continuing the stripped-down garage rock nature of the duo, White Blood Cells features less of the band's blues rock influences, instead displaying a more raw, basic, and primitive rock and roll sound. The album's lyrical themes, which were written by White over a period of four years, touch on themes relating to love, hope, betrayal, and paranoia. Following a major label re-release on V2 Records in 2002, the album became promoted throughout the music press, bringing the band critical acclaim. The White Stripes followed with a worldwide tour and the record peaked at number 61 on the Billboard 200, later being certified platinum by the Recording Industry Association of America. The album's cover art satirically parodies the amount of increasing mainstream popularity the band was receiving, which depicts the duo attacked by photographers.

Praised for its simplicity and straightforward sound and instrumentation, White Blood Cells set the stage for the White Stripes to break through into the mainstream and is often compared with classic rock influences. It helped define the band's sound and shape the band's role in the garage rock revival of the early 2000s. The album has been, along with the band's follow-up Elephant (2003), featured on several music publications' lists of the greatest albums of the 2000s as well as all-time.

Recording and production
The band rehearsed for one week and recorded the album at Easley-McCain Recording, in Memphis, Tennessee over three days in 2001. Meg White was initially hesitant to commence immediate recording, as she thought the songs were "too new." The album was recorded in less than four days, to try to keep it "as unorganized as possible," according to Jack. The record's quick production was intentional in order to get "a real tense" feeling, as well as capture the band's energy. The record was "rushed" and a final day was saved for mixing and mastering the record; this was the first White Stripes album to be mastered in the studio. It was the first time for the band recording in a 24-track recording studio, and Jack White asked recording engineer Stuart Sikes more than once "not to make it sound too good."

Packaging
The cover art of White Blood Cells depicts the duo getting both attacked and enamored by a clan of people wielding TV and video cameras. The images poke fun at the music industry and promotion surrounding it. "When does music become a business and why do we have to be suckered into it? Why do we have to buy a cell phone, you know what I mean? A lot of that stuff upsets me. It gets annoying," said Jack White. The album's title alludes to the increasing media attention the band was receiving, which would only increase after release. "The name, White Blood Cells, for the album, is this idea of bacteria coming at us, or just foreign things coming at us, or media, or attention on the band," Jack White explained in a 2001 interview. "It just seems to us that there are so many bands from the same time or before we started that were playing and are still playing that didn't get this kind of attention that we're getting. Is the attention good or bad? When you open the CD, it's a picture of us with these cameras. Wondering if it's good or bad."

Composition

Lyrics
The lyrics for the album were written over various points in the band's early career, including unrecorded songs for the duo's debut album The White Stripes (1999) and Jack White's previous band Two-Star Tabernacle. "Dead Leaves and the Dirty Ground", for example, was included in the album though Jack had written the song in 1999 and the band had been performing it along with "The Same Boy You've Always Known" since early 2000. This led to speculation that the songs are about the end of Jack and Meg White's marriage. Some material for White Blood Cells was also inspired by Jack White and the Bricks, a side-project formed in 1999. Regarding the four-year time span in writing for the record, Jack White said "It was cool because a lot of things had been sitting around for a long time, stuff I had written on piano that had been just sitting around not doing anything. And it was good to put them all together at once, put them all in the same box and see what happened." All material on the album is original, a contrast to numerous covers on the band's first two efforts. The lyrics relate and touch upon subjects of love, hope, betrayal, and paranoia, brought on by the increasing media attention the duo began receiving. A common theme throughout the record is the morality of persistent attention, most prevalently profiled in "Little Room".  "Little Room" is "homily," written in response to White's favorite song, "Grinnin’ in Your Face" by Son House.

"The Union Forever" contains allusions to Citizen Kane (1941), reportedly Jack White's favorite film. In fact, nearly every line in the song comes from the movie. In 2003 it was rumoured that Warner Bros., who own the rights to Citizen Kane, might sue the band over copyright infringement, but nothing seems to have come from it. "Hotel Yorba" is based on a real hotel a couple of blocks from Jack White's childhood home: "The Hotel Yorba is a really disgusting hotel," he remarked to Spin in 2001. "There was a great rumor when I was a kid that The Beatles had stayed there. They never did, but I loved that rumor. It was funny."

Music
The album attempts to rid the band of a blues rock sound, instead vying for a more simple guitar and drums garage rock sound. Shortly before the release of White Blood Cells, White asserted that "There's no blues on the new record. We're taking a break from that. There's no slide work, bass, guitar solos, or cover songs. It's just me and Meg, guitar, drums and piano." The duo intended to break away from the "bringing-back-the-blues label," instead containing piano-driven tracks that, to that point, remained unrecorded. Influences are present from a variety of genres, including childlike love songs ("We're Going to Be Friends").

Release and reception

White Blood Cells was rushed onto the shelves by Sympathy, although the record label wasn't prepared to handle the hype that would surround the record. White Blood Cells was released to nearly universal acclaim. On Metacritic, the album received a weighted mean score of 86/100, which translates to "universal acclaim." Considered the band's commercial breakthrough, White Blood Cells peaked at number 61 on the Billboard 200, going Platinum and selling over 1,000,000 units. The album also reached number 55 in the United Kingdom, being bolstered in both territories by the "Fell in Love with a Girl" single and its Lego-animation music video. Stylus magazine rated it the fifteenth greatest album of 2000–2005 while Pitchfork ranked it ninth on their list of the top 100 albums from 2000–2004, and twelfth on their top 200 of the 2000s (decade). Uncut Magazine placed it first in their list of the greatest 150 albums of the 2000s (decade).

The album was dedicated to Loretta Lynn, creating a friendship between Lynn and both Jack and Meg White. In 2004, Jack White would produce Lynn's comeback hit album Van Lear Rose.

Redd Kross bassist Steven Shane McDonald created an online-only art project, titled Redd Blood Cells, in which he added a bass track to the otherwise bass-less album. The White Stripes arranged with Steven to take the files down after more than 60,000 downloads.

Rolling Stone named White Blood Cells the nineteenth best album of the decade, and "Fell in Love with a Girl" the fifty-eighth best song of the decade. Q listed White Blood Cells as one of the best 50 albums of 2001.

Legacy

Rankings
The album was ranked on many "best of 2001" year-end lists, including being ranked among Blender, Rolling Stone, Mojo, and Kerrang!'''s top 20, NME, Pitchfork, and The Village Voices top 10. Spin called White Blood Cells the best album of 2001. In 2003, the record was chosen as number 20 on NMEs Top 100 Albums of All Time. In 2005, Spin placed it at number 57 in its list of the 100 Greatest Albums, 1985–2005, while Stylus included it at number 14 in its list of the Top 50 Albums of 2000–2005. In 2006, Mojo featured it at number 28 in its list of 100 Modern Classics, 1993–2006.

As the 2000s drew to a close, White Blood Cells was included on several publications' lists of best of the decade. The A.V. Club ranked it as the number one best album of the decade in its Top 50 Albums of the 2000s list. British music magazine Uncut also ranked the record as the best album of the 2000s in its 2009 list Top 150 Albums of the 2000s. Billboard placed the record at number eleven on its Top 20 Albums of the 2000s, while Rolling Stone included it just behind the White Stripes' follow-up, Elephant, at number 20 on its Top 100 Albums of the 2000s. NME featured the album at number 19 on its Top 100 Albums of the 2000s list, and Pitchforks Top 200 Albums of the 2000s included it as number 12. Several other music publications, including Consequence of Sound, The Daily Californian, Glide, and Under the Radar featured White Blood Cells within the top 30 greatest records of the 2000s. The record is included in both The Guardians "1000 Albums To Hear Before You Die" and the book 1001 Albums You Must Hear Before You Die.

In 2012, Rolling Stone included White Blood Cells'' as #497 on their list of the 500 greatest albums of all time, saying, "Jack's Delta-roadhouse fantasies, Detroit-garage-rock razzle and busted-love lyricism, as well as Meg's toy-thunder drumming all peaked at once."

Track listing

Bonus DVD
Some editions were released with a bonus DVD.

Audio

Video

Personnel
Jack White – lead vocals, guitar, piano, organ, songwriting, production
Meg White – drums, tambourine, backing vocals

Charts

Weekly charts

Year-end charts

Certifications and sales

See also 
 Album era

References

Notes

External links

The White Stripes albums
2001 albums
Sympathy for the Record Industry albums
V2 Records albums
Albums produced by Jack White
Third Man Records albums